Events from the year 1179 in Ireland.

Incumbent
Lord: John

Events
 Tallaght and its hinterland, previously within the Diocese of Glendalough, confirmed as holdings of the Archdiocese of Dublin.